Treworthal is a hamlet in the parish of Philleigh, Cornwall, England, United Kingdom.

References

Hamlets in Cornwall